Mark Bedlington (born 24 April 1963) is a Canadian sports shooter. He competed in the men's 50 metre running target event at the 1984 Summer Olympics.

References

External links
 

1963 births
Living people
Canadian male sport shooters
Olympic shooters of Canada
Shooters at the 1984 Summer Olympics
Sportspeople from Peterborough, Ontario
Commonwealth Games medallists in shooting
Commonwealth Games gold medallists for Canada
Commonwealth Games silver medallists for Canada
Pan American Games medalists in shooting
Pan American Games bronze medalists for Canada
Shooters at the 1987 Pan American Games
Medalists at the 1987 Pan American Games
Shooters at the 1990 Commonwealth Games
Shooters at the 1994 Commonwealth Games
20th-century Canadian people
Medallists at the 1990 Commonwealth Games
Medallists at the 1994 Commonwealth Games